Nikolaos Andrikopoulos (born 17 April 1997) is a Greek triple jumper. He represented Greece at the 2023 European Indoor Championships in Istanbul. He won the silver medal in the final with a jump of 16.58 metres.

Competition record

References

External links

1997 births
Living people
Greek male triple jumpers
Athletes from Athens